Can't Slow Down is the ninth studio album by the British-American rock band Foreigner and their most recent album to date. It was the band's first studio release with lead singer Kelly Hansen and bassist Jeff Pilson and the group's first new studio album since 1994's Mr. Moonlight. In the U.S. the album was first available exclusively through Wal-Mart retailers.

The song "Too Late" had previously been featured on the group's 2008 compilation album No End in Sight: The Very Best of Foreigner.

Marti Frederiksen and guitarist Mick Jones' stepson, Mark Ronson co-produced the album.

With the band starting a farewell tour in 2023, Can't Slow Down will likely be their final studio album.

Reception

Can't Slow Down debuted at 29 on the Billboard 200. The first two singles from the album, "When It Comes to Love" and "In Pieces" both reached the Top 20 on Billboard's Adult Contemporary chart.

In 2010 it was awarded a gold certification from the Independent Music Companies Association, which indicated sales of at least 100,000 copies throughout Europe.

Track listing
All songs written by Mick Jones, Kelly Hansen, and Marti Frederiksen, except where noted.

Disc 1 (CD) - The Album
"Can't Slow Down" - 3:28
"In Pieces" - 3:53
"When It Comes to Love" - 3:54
"Living In a Dream" - 3:43
"I Can't Give Up" (Jones, Hansen, Frederiksen, Steve McEwan) - 4:32
"Ready" - 3:43
"Give Me a Sign" - 3:52
"I'll Be Home Tonight" - 4:14
"Too Late" (Jones, Frederiksen, Oliver Leiber, Russ Irwin) - 3:45
"Lonely" (McEwan, Frederiksen) - 3:29
"As Long as I Live" - 3:48
"Angel Tonight" - 3:32
"Fool for You Anyway" (Jones) - 4:04

Disc 2 (CD) - The Remixes
"Feels Like the First Time"
"Cold as Ice"
"Hot Blooded"
"Blue Morning, Blue Day"
"Double Vision"
"Dirty White Boy"
"Head Games"
"Juke Box Hero"
"Urgent"
"I Want to Know What Love Is"

Disc 3 (DVD) - Live and More
"Double Vision"
"Head Games"
"That Was Yesterday"
"Say You Will"
"Starrider"
"Feels Like the First Time"
"Urgent"
"Juke Box Hero"
"I Want to Know What Love Is"
"Hot Blooded"

Personnel 
Foreigner
 Kelly Hansen – lead and backing vocals
 Mick Jones – acoustic piano, lead guitar, backing vocals
 Michael Bluestein – keyboards, backing vocals
 Thom Gimbel – guitars, saxophone, backing vocals
 Jeff Pilson – bass, backing vocals
 Brian Tichy – drums, percussion

Additional Musicians
 Marti Frederiksen – keyboards, guitars, percussion, backing vocals
 Russ Irwin – keyboards on "Too Late"
 Jason Bonham – drums on "Too Late"
 Ryan Brown – drums on "Lonely"
 Jason Paige – backing vocals
 Suzie McNeil – backing vocals

Production 
 Producers – Marti Frederiksen and Mick Jones (Tracks 1-12); Mark Ronson (Track 13).
 Recorded by Marti Frederiksen
 Additional and Vocal Engineer – Jason Paige
 Mixing – Anthony Focx and Marti Frederiksen
 Edited and Mastered by Anthony Focx
 Art Direction – Hackmart, Inc.
 Photography – Bill Bernstein

Charts

Certifications

References

2009 albums
Foreigner (band) albums
Albums produced by Mark Ronson
Albums produced by Marti Frederiksen